Mohan Rangachari (16 October 1952 – 10 June 2019) known professionally as Crazy Mohan, was an Indian actor, comedian, screenwriter and playwright. An engineer by profession, Mohan started writing plays and established his own drama troupe called "Crazy Creations" in 1979. In addition to dramas and tele-serials, Mohan worked as a dialogue writer on a number of comedy films. Mohan had written over 30 plays, worked on over 40 films, having cameo roles in each film, and written 100 short stories. The Tamil Nadu state government in the year 2004, awarded him the Kalaimamani title for excellence in the field of arts and literature.

Career 

Mohan was a student at the College of Engineering, Guindy, where he graduated as a mechanical engineer in 1973. His guide was his classmate S. Ravi, who was the President of Tamil Mandram. Before becoming a full-time writer, Mohan was working at Sundaram - Clayton Limited.

At the College of Engineering, Guindy, in February 1972, he first wrote Great Bank Robbery, a skit for an intra class contest within the Guindy Engineering college for which he received the Best Writer award. It was followed by scripts for his younger brother Maadhu Balaji's drama troupe at Ramakrishna Mission Vivekananda College, Chennai. The first full-length play he wrote was Crazy Thieves in Paalavakkam for Natakapriya in 1976, which was a runaway hit and gave him the nom de plume "Crazy" Mohan. He also wrote scripts for Tenant Commandments and One More Exorcist.

After writing for other productions, Mohan decided to start his own troupe and founded Crazy Creations in 1979. The troupe has since created over 30 plays with original scripts and staged over 6,500 shows all over India and abroad. His play Chocolate Krishna had been staged 500 times within three years. His brother Maadhu Balaji, who is an actor, plays the hero in all his dramas.

The first feature film he worked on was K. Balachander's Poikkal Kudhirai for which he wrote the dialogues. The film itself was based on Mohan's drama Marriage made in Saloon. He went on to write dialogues for several comedy films, particularly starring Kamal Haasan, which include Sathi Leelavathi, Kaathala Kaathala, Michael Madana Kama Rajan, Apoorva Sagodharargal, Indian, Avvai Shanmughi, Thenali, Panchathanthiram and Vasool Raja MBBS. The 2006 film Jerry had a story and screenplay by Mohan and featured Mohan's entire theatre team, including its director S. B. Khanthan. He has also acted in supporting or cameo roles in the films he wrote the dialogue or script for.

In 1989, he also began producing television comedy series. Serials he produced include Here is Crazy, Kalyanathukku Kalyanam with over 600 episodes and Vidathu Sirippu, with the latter winning the Best Comedy Serial award from Mylapore Academy in 2005. He also wrote 100 short stories.

Mohan was also a distinguished artist who has sketched/painted nearly 60 aesthetic paintings, including portraits of spiritual leaders and eminent personalities, Raja Ravi Verma’s portraitures and portraits of Gods and Prophets.

Mohan penned at least one Venba every day—over 40,000 Venbas in his lifetime.

Awards 

Best Dialogue Writer - 14th Cinema Express Awards for Chinna Mapillai

State awards 
The Tamil Nadu state government in the year 2004, awarded him the Kalaimamani title for excellence in the field of arts and literature.

International awards 
Professional excellence award by The Governor of Maryland, USA, for his outstanding contributions to Tamil literature, fine arts, theatres for more than 38 years.

Philanthropy 
Mohan was a donor and philanthropist for over 39 years. He contributed donations towards heart surgeries, kidney transplants from the proceeds from the sale of his drama tickets.

Donations to the Cancer Institute, Adyar run by Dr. V.Shantha, since 1999.

The proceeds from the sales of his book- 'Crazy about Ramana'  are re-directed towards educating Indian culture and values to poor children studying in Government schools.

Works

Theatre 
Some of his popular Tamil dramas as a dialogue writer and actor are listed below.

 Maadhu +2
 Jurassic Baby
 Marriage Made in Saloon
 Meesai Aanaalum Manaivi
 Alaavudeenum 100 Watts Bulbum
 Crazy Kishkintha
 Return of Crazy Thieves
 Oru Babiyin Diary Kurippu
 Kathalikka Maadhu Undu
 Maadhu Mirandal
 Madhil Mel Maadhu
 Chocolate Krishna
 Satellite Saamiyaar
 Crazy Thieves in Paalavaakkam
 Oru Sontha Veedu Vaadagai Veedagirathu
 Ayya Amma Ammamma
 Google Gadothgajan
 Crazy Premier League (CPL)
 Gummaala Gokulam (Upcoming Drama)
 Veetai Maatri Katti Paar

Serials 
Aachi international (1997)
Vidathu Sirippu (2004)
Siri Siri Crazy (2007)

Film 
As a script and dialogue writer
 Poikkal Kudhirai (1983)
 Katha Nayagan (1988)
 Apoorva Sagodharargal (1989)
 Michael Madana Kama Rajan (1990)
 Unnai Solli Kutramillai (1990)
 Indran Chandran (1990)
 Chinna Mapillai (1993)
 Magalir Mattum (1994)
 Vietnam Colony (1994)
 Chinna Vathiyar (1995)
 Engirundho Vandhan (1995)
 Sathi Leelavathi (1995)
 Avvai Shanmughi (1996)
 Mr. Romeo (1996)
 Arunachalam (1997)
 Sishya (1997)
 Ratchagan (1997)
 Thedinen Vanthathu (1997)
 Aahaa..! (1997)
 Kaathala Kaathala (1998)
 Kannodu Kanbathellam (1999)
 Endrendrum Kadhal (1999)
 Poovellam Kettuppar (1999)
 Thenali (2000)
 Little John (2001)
 Panchathanthiram (2002)
 Pammal K. Sambandam (2002)
 Vasool Raja MBBS (2004)
 Idhaya Thirudan (2006)
 Jerry (2006)
 Kola Kolaya Mundhirika (2010)
 Manmadhan Ambu (2010)
 Naan Ee (2012)

As an actor

 Janavari Onnu (1984)
 Apoorva Sagodharargal (1989) - Car customer
 Indrudu Chandrudu (1989) - Mental patient
 Michael Madhana Kamarajan (1990) - Grocery shop owner
 Jagadeka Veerudu Athiloka Sundari (1990; Telugu) - Kannada speaking tourist
 Thambi Pondatti (1992)
 Kalikaalam (1992)
 Magalir Mattum (1994) - First Doctor at Hospital
 Chinna Vathiyar (1995) - Doctor
 Indian (1996) - Parthasarathy
 Mr. Romeo (1996)
 Avvai Shanmughi (1996) - Interviewer
 Sishya (1997)
 Thedinen Vanthathu (1997) - Bank manager
 Arunachalam (1997)
 Kaathala Kaathala (1998) - Fraud Saamiyar (Anandha Vigadanandha)
 Arunachalam (1999) - Ayyasamy
 Kannodu Kanbathellam (1999)
 Endrendrum Kadhal (1999) - Astrologer
 Sigamani Ramamani (2001)
 Dosth (2001)
 Pammal K. Sambandam (2002) - ENT Specialist
 Panchathantiram (2002)
 Vasool Raja MBBS (2004) - Dr. Margabandhu
 Idhaya Thirudan (2005)
 Jerry (2006) - Rukku
 Kola Kolaya Mundhirika (2010) - Deaf Judge
 Naan Ee (2012) - Doctor
 Puthagam (2013) - Varadachari
 Kalyana Samayal Saadham (2013) - Dr. Kamlesh (final film role)

Television plays
 Here is Crazy
 Maadhu Cheenu
 Nil Gavani Crazy (Sun TV)
 Siri Gama Padhani
 Crazy Times (Vijay TV)
 Vidathu Sirippu (Jaya TV)
 Siri Siri Crazy (Kalaignar TV)
Web series

 Karoline Kamakshi (2019)

Death 
Mohan complained of stomach pain and breathlessness in the morning of 10 June 2019. After he suffered a heart attack, Mohan was rushed to Kauvery Hospital by Maadhu Balaji. A team of doctors worked on Mohan for hours to revive him. All efforts to revive him failed, and Mohan was declared dead at around 2:00 PM IST the same day.

References

External links 
 Official website
 

Tamil male actors
Tamil screenwriters
Tamil comedians
Tamil dramatists and playwrights
2019 deaths
1952 births
College of Engineering, Guindy alumni
Recipients of the Kalaimamani Award
Indian male comedians
Male actors from Tamil Nadu
20th-century Indian male actors
Screenwriters from Tamil Nadu
Indian male screenwriters
20th-century Indian dramatists and playwrights
Male actors in Tamil cinema
20th-century Indian male writers